The Seboeis River is a river in Penobscot County, Maine. The river is the outflow of Snowshoe Lake in Maine Township 7, Range 7, WELS; Snowshoe Lake is fed via a short stream from Grand Lake Seboeis.

Grand Lake Seboeis

Grand Lake Seboeis forms the headwaters of the Seboeis River and is the largest lake in the Seboeis River watershed. A central narrows separates the southern and northern basins of the lake located in Maine range 7 townships 7 and 8, respectively. The south end of the lake overflows into Snowshoe Lake. Tributaries to the lake include Batch Brook, Jones Brook, Dead Brook, Coombs Brook, and the Wadleigh Deadwater. Stocking has introduced smallmouth bass to the native chain pickerel population.

See also
List of rivers of Maine

References

Maine Streamflow Data from the USGS
Maine Watershed Data From Environmental Protection Agency

Rivers of Penobscot County, Maine
Tributaries of the Penobscot River
North Maine Woods
Rivers of Maine